Nuno Melo may refer to:

 Nuno Melo (politician), Portuguese politician
 Nuno Melo (actor), Portuguese actor